Jagannath Pathak is a Sanskrit scholar and poet. In 1981 his poetry collection Kapishayani won the Sahitya Akademi Award for Sanskrit. He also won the Sahitya Akademi Translation Prize (for Sanskrit) in 2004, for translating Mirza Ghalib's Diwan-E-Ghalib Urdu poetry into Sanskrit as Ghaliba Kavyam.

References

Sanskrit poets
Living people
Recipients of the Sahitya Akademi Award in Sanskrit
Year of birth missing (living people)
Recipients of the Sahitya Akademi Prize for Translation

3. https://jagannathpathak.info/ for more information about Dr. Jagannath Pathak..